"No Problem" is a song by American rapper Lil Scrappy. It is his second single and the fourth single overall from the album The King of Crunk & BME Recordings Present: Trillville & Lil Scrappy (2004). The song was produced by Lil Jon.

The music video of the song was inspired by the film Training Day, and features cameos from Lil Jon, The Game, Snoop Dogg, WC and Terry Crews.

Charts

Certifications

Release history

References

2004 singles
2004 songs
Lil Scrappy songs
Reprise Records singles
Warner Records singles